Jeff Howell may refer to:
 Jeff Howell (baseball) (born 1983), American baseball player on the 2014 Washington Nationals season spring training roster
 Jeff Howell (journalist) (fl. c. 1990), voice actor and host of The Monsters in the Morning radio show
 Jeff Howell (musician) (fl. c. 1990), former member of The Outlaws
 Jeff Howell (actor) (fl. 1990s), American actor in the film Two Evil Eyes

See also
 Jeff Howe, Minnesota politician